Surorove may refer to the following places in Ukraine:

Crimea
Suvorove, Armyansk Municipality, Crimea
Suvorove, Bakhchysarai Raion, Crimea

Elsewhere
Suvorove, Donetsk Oblast
Suvorove, Odesa Oblast
Suvorove, Sumy Oblast